Johnny Stanley (26 November 1905 – 6 May 1985) was  a former Australian rules footballer who played with Footscray in the Victorian Football League (VFL).

Notes

External links 
		

1905 births
1985 deaths
Australian rules footballers from Victoria (Australia)
Western Bulldogs players